Tradescantia crassula, common names succulent spiderwort and white-flowered tradescantia, is a species of plants in the Commelinaceae. It is native to southeastern Brazil, Uruguay, and the Misiones Province of Argentina, and has been introduced to Florida. It flowers in May in Florida, and can be found under Oak Trees.

When first described in 1828, the native range of the plant was unknown.

References

crassula
Plants described in 1828
Flora of South America